Mount Pleasant is a community in the Canadian province of Nova Scotia, located in the District of Clare in Digby County .

References
 Mount Pleasant on Destination Nova Scotia

Communities in Digby County, Nova Scotia
General Service Areas in Nova Scotia